Tuxentius carana, the forest pied Pierrot, is a butterfly in the family Lycaenidae. It is found in Guinea, Sierra Leone, Liberia, Ivory Coast, Ghana, Togo, Nigeria, Cameroon, Gabon, the Republic of the Congo, Angola, the Central African Republic and the DRC. The habitat consists of forests.

Adult males mud-puddle.

Subspecies
Tuxentius carana carana – Nigeria: Cross River loop, Cameroon, Gabon, Congo, northern Angola, Central African Republic, Democratic Republic of the Congo
Tuxentius carana kontu (Karsch, 1893) – Guinea, Sierra Leone, Liberia, Ivory Coast, Ghana, Togo, western Nigeria

References

Butterflies described in 1876
Polyommatini
Butterflies of Africa
Taxa named by William Chapman Hewitson